TUD can refer to:

 Tud, a village in Iran
 Darmstadt University of Technology
 Delft University of Technology
 Dresden University of Technology
 Technical University of Denmark
 Tobacco use disorder
 Technological University Dublin
 PSA TUD engine, the diesel variant of a family of car engines